William Harrell Nellis (March 8, 1916 – December 27, 1944) was a United States fighter pilot who flew 70 World War II combat missions. He was shot down three times, the last time fatally. On April 30, 1950, the Las Vegas Air Force Base in Nevada was renamed Nellis Air Force Base in his honor.

Soon after his birth in Santa Rita, New Mexico, Nellis and his parents Cecil and Marguerite, moved to Searchlight, Nevada, and, when he was 13, to Las Vegas.  Nellis graduated from Las Vegas High School; he did not go to college, but subsequently joined the Army Enlisted Reserve Corps on December 9, 1942, training in Albany, Georgia.  He was commissioned a flight officer on January 7, 1944.  and on July 9, Nellis was assigned to the 513th Fighter Squadron, in support of General George Patton's Third Army.

On December 27, 1944, flying a P-47 Thunderbolt during the Battle of the Bulge, he was shot down by ground fire while strafing a German convoy in Luxembourg.  He was too low to bail out, and crashed near Winseler. Nellis' remains were recovered from his wrecked aircraft the following April. He was buried at Henri-Chapelle American Cemetery and Memorial near Liège, Belgium.

References

External links
 

1916 births
1944 deaths
People from Searchlight, Nevada
People from the Las Vegas Valley
People from Santa Rita, New Mexico
United States Army Air Forces pilots of World War II
Shot-down aviators
United States Army Air Forces personnel killed in World War II
Recipients of the Legion of Merit
Recipients of the Distinguished Flying Cross (United States)
United States Army Air Forces officers
Aviators killed by being shot down
Aviators killed in aviation accidents or incidents in Belgium
Las Vegas High School alumni
Military personnel from Nevada
Military personnel from New Mexico